Gol Tappeh is a village in Anzal-e Jonubi Rural District, Anzal District, Urmia County, West Azerbaijan Province, Iran. At the 2006 census, its population was 1,894, in 365 families. The village is populated by Azerbaijanis and Kurds.

References 

Populated places in Urmia County

Kurdish settlements in West Azerbaijan Province